The 1935 San Francisco Seals season was the 33rd season in the history of the San Francisco Seals baseball team. The team compiled a 103–70 record and won the PCL pennant. 

In January 1935, the Seals hired Lefty O'Doul as the team's player-manager. O'Doul had played for the Seals at the start of his playing career and went on to play 11 years in the major leagues, winning National League batting titles in 1929 and 1932. At age 38, he appeared in 68 games for the 1936 Seals, compiling a .269 batting average. He continued as the Seals' manager through the 1951 season.

Outfielder Joe DiMaggio, a 20-year-old native of the San Francisco Bay Area, was the team's brightest star. Though he finished one point behind Ox Eckhardt in the competition for PCL batting championship, DiMaggio was selected as the PCL's most valuable player, led the league in RBIs (154), runs scored (173), and triples (18), and ranked second with 34 home runs. DiMaggio had been sold to the New York Yankees in November 1934, but on the condition that he would remain with the Seals for the 1935 season.

In the PCL championship series, played in late September, the Seals defeated the Los Angeles Angels four games to two.

Players

Batting 
Note: Pos = Position; G = Games played; AB = At bats; H = Hits; Avg. = Batting average; HR = Home runs; SLG = Slugging percentage

Pitching 
Note: G = Games pitched; IP = Innings pitched; W = Wins; L = Losses; PCT = Win percentage; ERA = Earned run average

References

Further reading
 "The Greatest Minor League: A History of the Pacific Coast League, 1903-1957", by Dennis Snelling (McFarland 2011)
 "San Francisco Seals", by Martin Jacobs & Jack McGuire (Arcadia Publishing 2005)

1935 in sports in California
Pacific Coast League seasons